The BMW Art Car Project was introduced by the French racecar driver and auctioneer Hervé Poulain, who wanted to invite an artist to create a canvas on an automobile.

In 1975, Poulain commissioned American artist and friend Alexander Calder to paint the first BMW Art Car. This first example would be a BMW 3.0 CSL which Poulain himself would race in the 1975 24 Hours of Le Mans endurance race.

Since Calder's work of art, many other renowned artists throughout the world have created BMW Art Cars, including  David Hockney, Jenny Holzer, Roy Lichtenstein, Robert Rauschenberg, Frank Stella, and Andy Warhol. To date, a total of 20 BMW Art Cars, based on both racing and regular production vehicles, have been created. Frank Stella also made one unofficial art car at the behest of race car driver Peter Gregg. The most recent artist to the join BMW Art Car program is Cao Fei in 2017 with her M6. Artists for the BMW Art Car Project are chosen by a panel of international judges.

According to Thomas Girst, who has been in charge of the BMW Art Cars project since 2004, the purpose of the project has changed over time: "In the beginning the cars were raced. There wasn't much of a public relations effort around them... Since then, some of the Art Cars have been used in advertisements to show that BMW is a player in the arts. With the Eliason work, part of what we are doing is raising awareness of alternative and renewable energy sources."

BMW Art Cars

* The 2009 project by Robin Rhode did not create an art car, but rather used a BMW Z4 driven over a giant canvas to create a work by applying paint with the car's tires.

Miniatures
Since 2003, BMW has released the Art Cars (at the time, this encompassed the entire series) as 1:18 scale miniature diecast.  

They are sold in limited edition by BMW dealers and shops. All of them have an elegant acrylic display and a grey base, iconic package with red box and an “art car” booklet inside. The first two to be released were Alexander Calder's BMW 3.0 CSL and Jenny Holzer's BMW V12 LMR. Initially 3000 copies each were to be produced with an MSRP of $125 (now $145) each.
Nowadays there are 17 miniatures, but there are 19 Bmw art cars, simply of 2 there are no miniatures. Only the works of Olafur Eliasson and Cao Fei do not have official miniatures because they are conceptual works.

Public display
In 2009, the Art Cars began a North American tour, starting at the Los Angeles County Museum of Art from February 12–24.  The second stop was in New York City from March 24 to April 6, in a special exhibit at Grand Central Terminal held in its Vanderbilt Hall. The Cars were exhibited in México, first in MARCO, Monterrey, and later in Guadalajara and Mexico City. In July 2012 a selection of the cars were presented by the Institute of Contemporary Arts in a Shoreditch car park as part of the London 2012 Festival, entitled Art Drive!.

Unofficial BMW Art Cars
In addition to the work commissioned by BMW, other artists have created unofficial BMW art cars. In 1979 racing driver Peter Gregg purchased a BMW M1 Procar and commissioned his friend Frank Stella to paint it for him; this car is the only BMW painted by an artist who was also part of BMW's own Art Car program. and was sold from the Guggenheim Museum to a BMW dealer in Long Island, New York in 2011. The car is part of Stella's "Polar Coordinates" series, created to commemorate Stella's friend Ronnie Peterson who had died in a racing incident at Monza in 1978. In 1987 Keith Haring painted a red BMW Z1 at Hans Mayer Gallery, Düsseldorf. In 2007, Portland’s Museum of Contemporary Craft commissioned artist Tom Cramer to paint a 1977 BMW 320i for their grand opening at the DeSoto Building. In 2016, the Cultural Council of Greater Jacksonville commissioned artist Christie Chandler to paint a BMW X6 for their annual awards gala at TPC Sawgrass.

See also
PaykanArtCar, another car related art project

References

External links

  An overview of BMW Art Cars with videos and a lot of information.

Art car
Art vehicles